Thor (Original Motion Picture Soundtrack) is the soundtrack to the Marvel Studios film of the same name, based on the character created by Marvel Comics. The music was composed by Patrick Doyle, conducted by James Shearman and performed by the London Symphony Orchestra. Buena Vista Records announced the details for the soundtrack in March 2011. It was released in some European territories at the end of April and was released on May 3 in the United States.

Track listing

Reception

James Christopher Monger of AllMusic stated that, "Composer Patrick Doyle, who brought a new-found boldness to the Harry Potter franchise in 2005 with his Goblet of Fire score, treats director Kenneth Branagh's big-screen adaptation of Marvel Comic's iconic Norse superhero Thor with appropriate gravitas. The longtime Branagh collaborator (Henry V, Dead Again) sets the stage with "Chasing the Storm," a tense and surging unveiling of the main theme, which sounds a bit like a cross between the James Newton Howard and Hans Zimmer's Batman Begins cue and Zimmer's "CheValiers de Sangreal" theme from The Da Vinci Code, and like Zimmer, Doyle knows how to whip a circular melody into a frenzy. Elsewhere, the lovely and appropriately stoic "Sons of Odin" is awash in traditional fantasy elements, while the epic "Compound" unveils a more modern, sci-fi action approach, resulting in a score that's wistful, heroic, and as grand as the fantastic realm of Asgard itself".

Danny Graydon of Empire stated, "Reuniting with long-time collaborator Kenneth Branagh, Patrick Doyle's score successfully mixes Wagnerian "Sturm und Drang" ("Frost Giant Battle") with cues brimming with nobility ("Chasing The Storm") and dramatic richness ("Odin Confesses" and "Banishment"). He also creates an engaging melodic core via the opposing themes of Thor and Loki and reaps dividends from his concerted distinction of the worlds of Asgard and Earth. It's just a shame that the omnipresence of choirs and percussion in current action scores somewhat dilutes the dynamism of Doyle's climatic cues".

References

External links
Thor Soundtrack- Amazon

Patrick Doyle soundtracks
2011 soundtrack albums
2010s film soundtrack albums
Marvel Cinematic Universe: Phase One soundtracks
Thor (film series)
Buena Vista Records soundtracks